Ludwig Pöhler (11 January 1916 – 26 March 1975) was a German international footballer.

References

1916 births
1975 deaths
Association football midfielders
German footballers
Germany international footballers
Hannover 96 players